Connor Alexander Tomlinson (born 12 February 2001) is an English semi-professional footballer who plays as a striker for  club Bedford Town.

Early and personal life
Tomlinson was born in Luton, Bedfordshire and attended Harlington Upper School. He is the son of former footballer Graeme Tomlinson.

Career

Luton Town
Tomlinson became the youngest player to make a first-team appearance for Luton Town at 15 years and 199 days old when he was introduced as a 92nd-minute substitute for Zane Banton in a 2–1 away win over Gillingham in an EFL Trophy group stage match on 30 August 2016. He signed scholarship terms with the club in the summer of 2017. Tomlinson joined National League South club Hemel Hempstead Town on 14 December 2018 on a one-month youth loan. He was released by Luton at the end of his scholarship.

Bedford Town
Tomlinson signed for Southern League Division One Central club Bedford Town on 16 July 2019 on a two-year contract. He made 32 appearances and scored seven goals in all competitions before the 2019–20 season was abandoned and results expunged because of the COVID-19 pandemic in England. Tomlinson signed a new two-year contract in May 2022.

Career statistics

References

External links
Profile at the Bedford Town F.C. website

2001 births
Living people
Footballers from Luton
English footballers
Association football forwards
Luton Town F.C. players
Hemel Hempstead Town F.C. players
Bedford Town F.C. players
National League (English football) players
Southern Football League players